Wes Clark (born December 12, 1994) is an American professional basketball player for Niners Chemnitz of the Basketball Bundesliga (BBL).

College career
As a junior at Missouri, Clark averaged 9.8 points, 3 rebounds, 3 assists per game. He was dismissed from the team in February 2016 due to failing to meet the academic standards. Clark decided to transfer to Buffalo, whose coach Nate Oats was Clark's coach at Romulus Senior High School. As a senior at Buffalo, Clark averaged 15.5 points and 5.4 assists per game.

Professional career
After completing his collegiate eligibility, Clark participated in the inaugural Dos Equis 3X3U National Championship. On August 2, 2018, Clark signed a deal with the Italian club New Basket Brindisi for the 2018–19 LBA season.

On July 23, 2019, he has signed with Pallacanestro Cantù of the Italian Lega Basket Serie A (LBA). Clark averaged 14.6 points, 3 rebounds and 3 assists per game. On June 25, 2020, he signed in France with SIG Strasbourg competing in the LNB Pro A. However, on August 25 he failed the medical examination and it was announced Clark would not join the team.

On November 4, 2020, Clark signed with Niners Chemnitz of the Basketball Bundesliga.

At the beginning of 2021, in mid-season, he makes his return to Italy signing for Reyer Venezia until the end of the 2020–21 season.

He returned to Brindisi in summer 2021 for two seasons until June 2023.

On September 22, 2022, he has signed with Limoges CSP of the LNB Pro A, as a medical replacement for Bryce Jones.

On October 26, 2022, he has signed with Niners Chemnitz of the Basketball Bundesliga (BBL) for a second stint.

References

External links
LBA profile
espn profile
Buffalo Bulls bio
Missouri Tigers bio

1994 births
Living people
American expatriate basketball people in Italy
American men's basketball players
Basketball players from Detroit
Buffalo Bulls men's basketball players
Lega Basket Serie A players
Limoges CSP players
Missouri Tigers men's basketball players
New Basket Brindisi players
NINERS Chemnitz players
Pallacanestro Cantù players
Point guards
Romulus Senior High School alumni
Shooting guards